Montalembert can refer to:
 André de Montalembert (1483–1553), French officer
 Marc René, marquis de Montalembert (1714–1800), French military engineer and writer
 Charles Forbes René de Montalembert (1810–1870), French publicist and historian
 Montalembert, Deux-Sèvres, a commune in the Deux-Sèvres department in France